Denis Grechikho (born 22 May 1999) is a Belarusian professional footballer who plays for BATE Borisov.

References

External links 
 
 

1999 births
Living people
People from Mogilev
Sportspeople from Mogilev Region
Belarusian footballers
Association football midfielders
Belarus international footballers
FC Dnepr Mogilev players
FC Dnyapro Mogilev players
FC Rukh Brest players
FC Dinamo Minsk players
FC BATE Borisov players